Aztec–Tanoan is a hypothetical and undemonstrated language family that proposes a genealogical relation between the Tanoan and the Uto-Aztecan families. In some forms, Aztec–Tanoan has also included the Zuni isolate. This proposed classification has not been definitively demonstrated, largely because of slow progress in the reconstruction of the intermediate stages of the two language families involved, but is still considered promising by many linguists. The grouping was originally proposed by Edward Sapir in his 1921 classification, but it was not until 1937 that supporting evidence was published by Benjamin Lee Whorf and G. L. Trager. Their proposal included some 67 proposed cognates, but subsequent reviews have found most of them to be unconvincing (monosyllables, onomatopoeia). A small number of their proposed cognates do seem to have some merit and in his 1997 review of the hypothesis Lyle Campbell states that the proposal is not implausible but requires detailed study. A recent article by Jane H. Hill argues that the evidence cited for the genetic relation by Whorf and Trager is better understood as a result of language contact between the Uto-Aztecan and Tanoan proto-languages.

Proposed cognates
The following word pairs are the proposed cognates from Whorf & Trager (1937) and Davis (1979) considered promising by Campbell (1997:273).

'stand', Uto-Aztecan wine/wene/wi-; Proto-Tanoan gwine (Whorf & Trager's set 12)
Uto-Aztecan siwa- 'woman'; Proto-Tanoan liw- (Davis Kiowa-Tanoan *siu) (Whorf & Trager's set 31 / Davis' set 85)
'three', Uto-Aztecan pahi; Proto-Tanoan poyuwo (Davis' UA *pahi/*pahayu; Kiowa-Tanoan *podzu(a)/*pocua) (Whorf & Trager's set 73)
Proto-Numic *pi(h)wi, *pi(h)yi 'heart'; Kiowa-Tanoan *pia(Davis) (Davis' set 3, Whorf & Trager's set 84)
Uto-Aztecan *pu:la 'tie'; Kiowa-Tanoan *phe, *ph^ 'wrap, tie' (Davis' set 14, Whorf & Tragers' set 87)

References

Bibliography
Davis, Irvine. 1979. The Kiowa-Tanoan, Keresan, and Zuni languages. In The languages of Native America: historical and comparative assessment, ed. Lyle Campbell and Marianne Mithun, 390-443. Austin: University of Texas Press.
 Campbell, Lyle. (1997). American Indian languages: The historical linguistics of Native America. New York: Oxford University Press. .
 Campbell, Lyle; & Mithun, Marianne (Eds.). (1979). The languages of native America: Historical and comparative assessment. Austin: University of Texas Press.
 Goddard, Ives (Ed.). (1996). Handbook of North American Indians: Languages (Vol. 17). Washington, D. C.: Smithsonian Institution. .
 Mithun, Marianne. (1999). The languages of Native North America. Cambridge: Cambridge University Press.  (hbk); .
 Whorf, Benjamin L.; & Trager, George L. (1937). The relationship of Uto-Aztecan and Tanoan. American Anthropologist, 39, 609–624.

 
Proposed language families